Paul Sanchez is a New Orleans-born and based American guitarist and a singer-songwriter. Sanchez was a founding member of the New Orleans band Cowboy Mouth. He was a guitarist and one of the primary singers and songwriters for the band from 1990 to 2006. Sanchez's songs have appeared in films and on television and have been performed by various artists such as Darius Rucker, Irma Thomas, Michael Cerveris, Susan Cowsill, Kevin Griffin and The Eli Young Band, Hootie and the Blowfish, John Boutté, Shamarr Allen, Glen Andrews and Kim Carson.

Life and career
Sanchez was born on the River Road along the levee of the Mississippi River. He grew up in New Orleans' blue-collar Irish Channel neighborhood, which is a historic home to stevedores and river pilots. Sanchez is a songwriter, musician, singer, producer, writer and actor. In January 2010, Off Beat Magazine gave Paul three Best of the Beat Awards; Songwriter of The Year, Best Song of the Year, and Best Folk/Rock Album for Stew Called New Orleans, which was his duet record with friend and collaborator John Boutté. In April of that same year, Gambit Weekly awarded him Best Roots Rock Performer at The Big Easy Awards.

His first musical endeavor was in the New Orleans band The Backbeats. Along with him was Vance DeGeneres, Steve Walters, and a drummer named Fred LeBlanc, who he would encounter later on.

In the late 1980s, Sanchez was playing in anti-folk genre, during his stint in New York. There he befriended artists Brenda Kahn, John S. Hall and Roger Manning.

He has released 11 CDs as a solo artist, while also releasing 11 CDs as a founding member of the New Orleans rock band Cowboy Mouth. He left the "Mouth" in 2006, just after a flood had upended the city of New Orleans. Sanchez was on tour with the Mouth when Hurricane Katrina ravaged the gulf. After that, he stayed on tour and wrote a post-Katrina tribute, "Home", which was featured in the Starz documentary New Orleans Music in Exile. 

In 2008, Sanchez released the rewritten version of his first solo release Jet Black & Jealous. The Eli Young Band made the song title their major label debut on Universal/Republic. Jet Black & Jealous made its debut at number 5 on the Billboard Country Album Charts in September 2008. In 2009, he published a book of essays entitled Pieces Of Me, which deals with such things as the sense of life, loss, and rebuilding after the flood. 

Primarily a songwriter, Paul has written songs with and for John Boutté, Shamarr Allen, Darius Rucker of Hootie and The Blowfish, Galactic, Glen David Andrews, Irma Thomas, Matt Perrine, Tony Award Winning actor Michael Cerveris, Vance DeGeneres, Susan Cowsill, Debbie Davis, Arsene DeLay, John Thomas Griffith, John Rankin, Kevin Griffin of Better Than Ezra, The Eli Young Band, Caleb Guillotte of Dead-Eye Dick and many more.

For the last few years, Sanchez has been writing, recording and performing a musical adaptation of New York Times Best Seller Nine Lives. Nine Lives has been performed in New York City at Symphony Space, Washington DC at Sixth & I, Los Angeles at Fais Do-Do and New Orleans at Le Petite Theater, The CAC, The Ellis Marsalis Center, and Tulane University's Dixon Hall.

He has appeared on the HBO series Treme as himself.

Discography

Cowboy Mouth studio albums
 Word of Mouth · 1992
 It Means Escape · 1994
 Are You With Me? · 1996
 Word of Mouth (Remix1) · 1996
 Mercyland · 1998
 Easy · 2000
 Uh Oh · 2003
 Voodoo Shoppe · 2006

Cowboy Mouth live albums and EPs
 Mouthin' Off (Live & More) · 1993
 Mouthin' Off (Live & More) (Remastered) · 1997
 Cowboy Mouth LIVE! (limited edition 5-song EP issued with Mercyland) · 1998
 Live in the X Lounge "Jenny Says" · 1998
 All You Need Is Live · 2000
 Live in the X Lounge "Easy" · 2000 & 2001
 Uh Oh (5-song Preview EP) · 2003
 Live at the Zoo · 2004

Solo albums
Life Is a Ride 2017
Magus Insipiens: 3 Song Cycles on Poems by Taliesin, Payne, and Sapho 2016, with Kayleen Sanchez
Heart Renovations 2016
Everything That Ends Begins Again 2014
Reclamation Of The Pie-Eyed Piper 2012, Paul Sanchez and the Rolling Road Show
Nine Lives – A Musical Story of New Orleans (The Complete Set) 2012
Nine Lives – A Musical Story of New Orleans (Volume One) 2011
Red Beans and Ricely Yours 2010
Bridging the Gap 2010, Shamarr Allen & Paul Sanchez
Farewell To Storyville 2009
Stew Called New Orleans 2009
Exit to Mystery Street 2008, produced by Dave Pirner, (Soul Asylum). Featuring guest appearances by Ivan Neville, Shamarr Allen, Susan Cowsill, James Andrews, Fredy Omar, & Craig Klein
Washed Away 2007, a compilation of songs from his first 6 recordings, all lost in the levee failure in New Orleans
Between Friends 2007, featuring guest appearances by Darius Rucker, John Boutte', Theresa Anderson, Jim Sonefeld, & Susan Cowsill.
Hurricane Party 2000, produced by Tim Sommer. Featuring guest appearances by Susan Cowsill, Vicki Peterson of The Bangles, Peter Holsapple, & John Boutte'
Live at Carrollton Station 1999, produced by Mike Mayeux
Sonoma Valley 1998, produced by Mike Mayeux. Guest appearances by Susan Cowsill, John Boutte' & John Thomas Griffith
Loose Parts 1997, produced by Peter Holsapple. Guest appearance by Susan Cowsill
Wasted Lives & Bluegrass 1995
Jet Black and Jealous 1993, recorded by Roger Manning

Awards and recognition

References

External links
Paul Sanchez official website

Cowboy Mouth members
Living people
American male singer-songwriters
Musicians from New Orleans
American rock singers
American alternative rock musicians
American rock guitarists
American male guitarists
Louisiana Isleño people
Singer-songwriters from Louisiana
Guitarists from Louisiana
Year of birth missing (living people)